Murat Yiğiter (born 8 May 1971), is a Turkish professional football manager and former footballer who played as a goalkeeper.

Career
Yiğiter spent his entire career in Turkey, starting as the reserve goalkeeper at Fenerbahçe. He had stints at various pro clubs in the Süper Lig and TFF First League, including Sökespor, Vanspor, Çaykur Rizespor, Trabzonspor, Diyarbakırspor and Kocaelispor.

Yiğiter was briefly appointed as manager for Diyarbakırspor in 2021.

Personal life
Murat is the father of Abdullah Yiğiter, who is also a professional football goalkeeper in Turkey.

Honours
Diyarbakırspor
TFF First League: 1998–99

References

External links
 Mackolik Profile

1971 births
Living people
Sportspeople from Bingöl
Turkish footballers
Turkish football managers
Fenerbahçe S.K. footballers
Göztepe S.K. footballers
Çaykur Rizespor footballers
Trabzonspor footballers
Diyarbakırspor footballers
Kocaelispor footballers
Süper Lig players
TFF First League players
Diyarbakırspor managers
Association football goalkeepers